Helen Glacier is located east of the Continental Divide in the northern Wind River Range in the US state of Wyoming. The glacier is located in the Fitzpatrick Wilderness of Shoshone National Forest, and is among the largest grouping of glaciers in the American Rocky Mountains. Helen Glacier flows to the east from a cirque to the northeast of Mount Helen.

References

See also
 List of glaciers in the United States

Glaciers of Fremont County, Wyoming
Shoshone National Forest
Glaciers of Wyoming